Erin Christie (born 20 March 1992) is a South African field hockey player for the South African national team.

International career
She participated at the 2018 Women's Hockey World Cup.

She was captain for the 2020 Summer Olympics.

Personal life
In 2015, she graduated from Stellenbosch University with a Postgraduate Certificate in Education and now teaches Physical Science at Rand Park High School in Johannesburg.

In 2019 she married Andrew Hilton Christie.

References

External links

1992 births
Living people
South African female field hockey players
Female field hockey defenders
Field hockey players at the 2018 Commonwealth Games
Commonwealth Games competitors for South Africa
Field hockey players at the 2020 Summer Olympics
Olympic field hockey players of South Africa
Stellenbosch University alumni
Crusaders Hockey Club players
20th-century South African women
21st-century South African women
Field hockey players at the 2022 Commonwealth Games